Wong Choon Wah (31 March 1947 – 31 January 2014) was a Malaysian footballer.

Career Overview
In Malaysia Cup competitions, Wong played for Selangor, winning the championship five times. From 1972 to 1973, Wong played professional football with South China in Hong Kong. Later, he played for Seiko in 1973/1974 season.

He also competed for Malaysia at the 1972 Summer Olympics and playing all three group games. Overall, Wong played 88 times for Malaysia and scored 20 international goals.

On 17 September 2014, FourFourTwo list him on their list of the top 25 Malaysian footballers of all time.

Style of play
According to journalist, Tony Mariadass, midfield general Choon Wah's style of play is similar to that of Luka Modric - elegant, elusive, artistic and dangerous.

Honours
Selangor
Malaysia Cup: 1968, 1969, 1971, 1975, 1976

South China
Hong Kong First Division: 1971–72

Seiko
Hong Kong Senior Shield: 1973–74

Malaysia
Pestabola Merdeka: 1968, 1973, 1974

Individual
 OCM Hall of Fame: 2004
IFFHS Men’s All Time Malaysia Dream Team: 2022

See also
 Football at the 1972 Summer Olympics

References

External links
 

1947 births
2014 deaths
Malaysian sportspeople of Chinese descent
Malaysian footballers
Malaysian expatriate footballers
Malaysia international footballers
Olympic footballers of Malaysia
Footballers at the 1972 Summer Olympics
Place of birth missing
Malaysian expatriate sportspeople in Hong Kong
Expatriate footballers in Hong Kong
Hong Kong First Division League players
South China AA players
Selangor FA players
Association football midfielders
Southeast Asian Games medalists in football
Southeast Asian Games silver medalists for Malaysia
Southeast Asian Games bronze medalists for Malaysia
Competitors at the 1969 Southeast Asian Peninsular Games